Binge & Purge (aka Binge and Purge and Catwalk Cannibals) is a 2002 Canadian horror film written and directed by Brian Clement.  It is about cannibal models who plot to take over a fascist police state.

Plot 
In the near future, the United States has become a fascist police state.  A string of brutal murders leads private investigators to uncover a secret plot by cannibals in control of the fashion industry.

Cast 
 Tamara Barnard as May
 Stephan Bourke as Vanzetti
 Fiona Eden-Walker as Number 11
 Moira Thomas as Audrey
 Amy Emel as Angelique
 Samara Zotzman as Damiana
 Gareth Gaudin as Karl Helfringer
 Rob Nesbitt as Bradley Gruber
 Chuck Depape as the Captain

Reception 
Andy McKeague of Monsters and Critics rated the film 2.5/5 stars and called it "a gut munching romp that is big on intestine chewing but low on plot".  James O'Ehley of Scifi Movie Page rated it 1/5 stars and wrote that it could be used as blackmail for all involved.  Michael Muzerall as Film Threat rated it 3/5 stars and wrote, "The film has all the right factors to be the next big thing in cult movies, but it lacks the feverish style or the ripping wit to cement the deal."

References

External links 
 

2002 films
2002 horror films
Canadian horror films
Canadian independent films
English-language Canadian films
Camcorder films
Films directed by Brian Clement
Films about cannibalism
2000s English-language films
2000s Canadian films
Films set in the future